Günter Oskar Dyhrenfurth (12 November 1886 – 14 April 1975) was a German-born, German and Swiss mountaineer, geologist and Himalayan explorer.  He won a gold medal in alpinism at the 1936 Summer Olympics.

Biography 
He led the International Himalaya Expedition (IHE) 1930 to Kangchenjunga, and another one, IHE 1934, to the Baltoro-region in the Karakorams, especially to explore the Gasherbrum-Group. This expedition made the first ascent of Sia Kangri and some of its sub-peaks and provided detailed information about the accessibility of the 8000ers Gasherbrum I and II. The first ascent of Gasherbrum I in 1958 was accomplished via the route proposed by Dyhrenfurth following the so-called IHE-spur and the SE-ridge.

Dyrenfurth was a very influential alpinist, expedition leader and chronicler of mountaineering. His son Norman G. Dyhrenfurth was also a mountaineer and became an important expedition leader and film maker.

Selected bibliography

References

External links 
 Anders Bolinder (1976). In Memoriam: Günter Oskar Dyhrenfurth, The Alpine Journal 1976. p. 268.
 Eberhard Jurgalski (2008). A BRIEF HISTORY OF HIGH ASIAN CHRONICLES

1886 births
1975 deaths
Swiss mountain climbers
German mountain climbers
Historians of mountaineering
Sportspeople from Wrocław
People from the Province of Silesia
Olympic competitors in art competitions